Suell is a surname. Notable people with the surname include:

Frans Suell (1744–1818), Swedish businessman
John Suell (fl. 1393), English politician

See also
M/S Frans Suell, cruiseferry connecting Helsinki, Finland and Stockholm
MT Frans Suell, oil tanker built in 1958
Suell Winn House, historic house at 72-74 Elm Street in Wakefield, Massachusetts
Suel (disambiguation)